Kepler-20b is an exoplanet orbiting Kepler-20 in a system 922 light years from Earth. It is classified as a Super-Earth, as it has a radius and mass greater than that of Earth. At about 1.87 , it would most likely be a Mini-Neptune, but its high mass of 9.7  implies that it is an iron-rich rocky world. Along with the other four planets in the system, Kepler-20b was announced on 20 December 2011.

References

Exoplanets discovered in 2011
B
Transiting exoplanets
20b
Super-Earths